Microlenecamptus is a genus of longhorn beetles of the subfamily Lamiinae, containing the following species:

 Microlenecamptus albonotatus (Pic, 1925)
 Microlenecamptus biocellatus (Schwarzer, 1925)
 Microlenecamptus nakabayashii Takakuwa, 1992
 Microlenecamptus obsoletus (Fairmaire, 1888)
 Microlenecamptus signatus (Aurivillius, 1914)

References

Dorcaschematini